Trophy Wife is an American television sitcom that aired during the 2013–14 television season on ABC. The series was co-created and executive produced by Emily Halpern and Sarah Haskins for ABC Studios. The series was green-lit by ABC for a series order pick up on May 10, 2013. The series originally ran from September 24, 2013 to May 13, 2014.

On May 8, 2014, ABC canceled the series after one season.

Premise
The series revolved around Kate (Malin Åkerman), a young, attractive, blonde party girl, who marries a middle aged lawyer named Pete (Bradley Whitford).  The marriage comes with Pete's two ex-wives: the stern, perfectionist doctor, Diane (Marcia Gay Harden), and the flaky, flamboyant, new age Jackie (Michaela Watkins).  Also, Pete has three children from the prior relationships: overachieving, good girl, Hillary (Bailee Madison), slacker Warren (Ryan Lee), and rambunctious Bert (Albert Tsai). The series explores the marriage and generation gap between Kate and Pete, along with the modern family dynamics between them, the ex-wives, and their respective children.

Production
Hillary was played by Gianna LePera in the pilot, but replaced with Bailee Madison when the series went into production.

On November 1, 2013, ABC gave a full-season order to the series bringing the first season to 22 episodes. Trophy Wife averaged 5.7 million total viewers and a 1.9 rating when factoring in seven-day DVR ratings.

Cast and characters
 Malin Åkerman as Kate Walfus-Harrison, Pete's third trophy wife
 Bradley Whitford as Pete Harrison, Kate's husband
 Marcia Gay Harden as Dr. Diane Buckley, Pete's first wife
 Michaela Watkins as Jackie Fisher, Pete's second wife
 Bailee Madison as Hillary Harrison, Pete and Diane's daughter (the role was portrayed by Gianna LePera in the televised pilot)
 Ryan Lee as Warren Harrison, Pete and Diane's son
 Albert Tsai as Bert Harrison, Pete and Jackie's adoptive son
 Natalie Morales as Meg Gomez, Kate's best friend

Reception
Trophy Wife has received very positive reviews. Melia Robinson of Business Insider named it the tenth best new TV show of 2013, saying that it "delivers fresh humor, steeped in irony with a surprising sweetness" and dubbed it "a 'Modern-er Family'". Hank Stuever of The Washington Post gave the series a "B", praising the adults as "entertaining to watch and believably flawed" and the kids as "talented wiseacres". Matt Webb Mitovich of TVLine called it one of the best and strongest new sitcoms of the year, but criticised the network for putting it in a "ghastly" time slot. He particularly singled out Malin Åkerman for praise, saying that she "no less than shines here, coming off as fun-loving but not flaky, warm and not overheated".

Other critics agreed with Roth Cornet of IGN singling out Åkerman's chemistry with co-star Bradley Whitford and her aptitude for physical comedy. Gabriel Mizrahi of The Huffington Post called Åkerman "terrific" and the show "funny and realistic" with "delightfully un-sitcom-y performances". Maggie Pehanick of PopSugar and Daniel Fienberg of HitFix also liked Åkerman and Whitford's chemistry, with Fienberg saying that "Åkerman's bubbly energy has instantly great foils in [Marcia Gay] Harden's brilliant iciness and [Michaela] Watkins' loopy mania and also in the sarcastic preppiness that Whitford plays as well as anyone." Danielle Turchiano of The Examiner gave the show 4 stars out of 5 and praised Åkerman, Harden, and Watkins for presenting "some of the most interesting and funniest women on television". She did feel that the title suggests the show is something that it's not, a point that Joanne Ostrow of The Denver Post agreed with. Willa Paskin of Salon called the title "terrible... an insult to its lovely, daffy main character and... at odds with the show's focus on female relationships. It's not just dumb marketing, it belies the women-are-not-reducible-to-clichés spirit of the show." She went on to call the show "wonderfully cast", particularly enjoying Åkerman's performance and saying that "Like the late Happy Endings' Elisha Cuthbert, she seems to delight in going for it in the way that only pretty blonde women who have been stuck playing pretty blonde love interests in romantic comedies can."

Executive producer Lee Eisenberg explained that the title is "meant to be ironic" and that the show will focus on how Åkerman's character is not like a "trophy wife". When Åkerman read the script, she loved the writing and the character and how "not trophy wife" she is.

Review aggregator Metacritic gives the series a weighted average score of 63% based on reviews from 28 critics, indicating "Generally favorable reviews".

Albert Tsai was nominated for a Critics' Choice Television Award for Best Supporting Actor in a Comedy Series.

International broadcast
Trophy Wife premiered in New Zealand on Monday 13 January 2014 on TV2 (New Zealand). It premiered at 8:30 pm, after the Shortland Street season premiere and the first episode of Super Fun Night. The following week it moved to its regular timeslot of 9:00 pm Monday. On Monday 10 February, due to high ratings, Trophy Wife was moved to an earlier timeslot of 8:00 pm, after The Middle. As of April 21, New Zealand was 4 episodes behind the US. From May 12, Trophy Wife moved to 8:40 pm, due to My Kitchen Rules. The series finale aired on Monday 23 June 2014.

The Show made its Australian debut on 7flix.  on Sunday August 29, 2016.

Trophy Wife is rated  PG  in New Zealand for coarse language and sexual references.
It was aired in India on Star World network

Episodes

References

External links
 

2010s American single-camera sitcoms
2013 American television series debuts
2014 American television series endings
American Broadcasting Company original programming
English-language television shows
Television series by ABC Studios
Television shows set in Los Angeles